The National Guard of the Republic of Kazakhstan (Qazaqstan Respublikasynyñ Ūlttyq ūlany) is the internal military force of Kazakhstan. The National Guard performs the military and civilian functions of the Internal Troops of Kazakhstan, which it succeeded. The National Guard often cooperates in unison with many local Kazakh police departments. The Ministry of Internal Affairs of Kazakhstan is the main government agency responsible for the management of the National Guard.

The National Guard shares some of the same goals and functions as its predecessor, the Internal Troops:

Provide security to important cargo and corrective institutions 
Maintain of a social order and a state of alertness during national emergencies such as natural disasters
Dismantle illegal armed formations
Prevent terrorist and/or illegal formations from being assembled in the boundaries of Kazakhstan

History
The Internal Troops of Kazakhstan, which is the precursor to the present-day National Guard, was formed by order of the President of Kazakhstan Nursultan Nazarbayev on January 10, 1992. On April 21, 2014, by a Presidential Decree, the internal troops of the Ministry of Internal Affairs of Kazakhstan were transformed into the National Guard of Kazakhstan. This was done as part of the government's new doctrine in relation to the armed forces that was adopted that year. In June 2016, Islamic militants killed three people at a National Guard facility in Aktobe during an ambush. In September 2018, it was reported that the National Guard received the first 8 Shaanxi Y-8's from the Shaanxi Aircraft Corporation.

Leadership 
The Commander-in-Chief of the National Guard (currently Major general Yerkin Botakanov) is appointed and dismissed by the President of the Republic of Kazakhstan. It is the seniormost post acting as the commanding officer of the entire branch, reporting to the president through the Minister of Internal Affairs. The assistant to the commander-in-chief and the head of all the headquarters directorates was known as the Chief of Staff.

First Deputy Commander-in-Chief of the National Guard of the Republic of Kazakhstan - Chief of Staff – Major general Aktanov K.M.

Deputy Commander-in-Chief of the National Guard – Major general Matkarimov A.M.

Deputy Commander-in-Chief of the National Guard for educational and social and legal work – Colonel Umbetov K.

Deputy Commander-in-Chief of the National Guard for Equipment and Armament – Colonel Voronkin K.

Deputy Commander-in-Chief of the National Guard for Logistics – Major general Omarkulov Zh.K.

Secretary of the Military Council of the National Guard of the Republic of Kazakhstan – Colonel Imirov S.K.

Organization

Regional commands
The National Guard is divided into the following 4 regional commands:

 Regional Command "Central" (based in Karaganda) – Colonel Shekarbekov S.A.
Military Unit 5451
Military Unit 5516
Military Unit 5510
 Regional Command "South (based in Almaty) – Major general Amriev T.K.
Special Operations Battalion "Military Unit 6654"
 Regional Command "West" (based in Oral) – Major general Zhumagaliev A. M.
 Regional Command "East" (based in Oskemen) – Major general Akbalin R.N.
The Central Regional Command is the largest formation of the National Guard.

Other affiliated units
 Kazakh Special Forces "Birkit"
 Band of the National Guard
 Song and Dance Ensemble of the National Guard
 Guard of Honour of the National Guard

Operations

Public security 
The servicemen of the Central Regional Command take part in the most significant international and socio-political events such as OSCE summits, the Asian Games, the Universiade, the EXPO and many others.  Military Units 5451, 5516 and 5510 ensured public order and security in Astana during the celebration of the 20th anniversary of the capital in 2018.

Military Institute
The branch of the National Guard focused on education is the Military Institute of the National Guard. It works to implement educational programmes of higher education and training future officers of the National Guard. It was founded as the Higher Military College of the Internal Troops by governmental decree on March 18, 1997. This date is today considered to be the official birthday of the institute. President Nazarbayev would present the school with its own ceremonial banner that December.

Symbols
The Emblem of the National Guard consists of an image of the sun's rays with a silhouette of a floating eagle similar to the eagle on the national flag, covered with a blue stripe at the bottom and a silhouette of a horse rider with a flag pole in their hands. At the bottom, the words National Guard, written in the Kazakh language are in between the sun and the eagle. Regional commanders, formations and military units of the National Guard have standard their own battle flags, usually belonging to a particular regiment.

In popular culture
In March 2018, a movie called Sixth Post premiered in Astana, showing the life and career of Erbol Otarbayev, a National Guard member who confronted convicts who escaped prison in Mangistau in 2012. The movie also shows the National Guard in its daily duties and responsibilities. The drama was directed by Serikbol Utepbergenov, while the Information and Communications Ministry of Kazakhstan, in coordination with the Khabar Agency filmed the movie. In April 2019, it was announced that the national guard would be filming a television series focusing on the role of Kazakh soldiers in battles on the Tajik-Afghan border in 1995.

Media 
 "Kalan" (Shield) Newspaper
 "Birkit" (Berkut) Magazine

Gallery

See also
 Republican Guard (Kazakhstan)
 Ministry of Internal Affairs of Kazakhstan
 Armed Forces of the Republic of Kazakhstan
 Internal Troops of Kazakhstan
 Military Police (Kazakhstan)

References

External links
National Guard of the Republic of Kazakhstan
Military Institute
История образования Национальной гвардии РК | Әскер KZ

Military of Kazakhstan
Gendarmerie
Law enforcement in Kazakhstan